Lyall may refer to:

 Lyall (name)
 Lyall (surname)
 Lyall Bay, a bay and a suburb in Wellington, New Zealand

See also
Mount Lyall (disambiguation)
Lyell (disambiguation)